Jon Eikemo (born 30 November 1939 in Åsane, Norway) is a Norwegian actor. He debuted on stage in 1961. He made his film debut in 1968, with the movie De ukjentes marked (The Market of the Outcasts).

Eikemo has been a minor political candidate for the Norwegian Centre Party.

References

External links 
Jon Eikemo Biography on Norsk Biografisk Leksikon

1939 births
Living people
Norwegian male stage actors
Norwegian male film actors
Spellemannprisen winners
Actors from Bergen